Monte Zebrù is a mountain of the Ortler Alps between Lombardy and South Tyrol, Italy.

Mountains of the Alps
Alpine three-thousanders
Mountains of Lombardy
Mountains of South Tyrol